Juan Marcelo Ojeda (born 10 November 1982 in Arroyo Seco, Santa Fe) is an Argentine football goalkeeper who plays for Deportivo Madryn.

Career
Ojeda made his debut for Rosario Central on May 28, 2004, in a 1–0 defeat against Colón de Santa Fe, he continued to play regularly for Central until his transfer to River during the January 2007 transfer window.

He was the first choice keeper at the beginning of the Apertura 2007 tournament, when incumbent Juan Pablo Carrizo was expected to depart for Lazio. However, Carrizo's transfer was delayed by a year, and he forced his way back into the squad, relegating Ojeda to the bench. In 2008, he was part of the River Plate squad that won the Clausura 2008 tournament, without making a single league appearance. Carrizo's transfer to Lazio was finally confirmed in June 2008.

External links
 Argentine Primera statistics
Football lineups profile
River Plate player profile

1982 births
Living people
People from Rosario Department
Argentine footballers
Association football goalkeepers
Rosario Central footballers
Club Atlético River Plate footballers
Unión La Calera footballers
C.D. Cuenca footballers
Chilean Primera División players
Argentine Primera División players
Expatriate footballers in Chile
Expatriate footballers in Ecuador
Expatriate footballers in Venezuela
Sportspeople from Santa Fe Province